Ravileh or Rovileh may refer to:
 Ravileh-ye Hasan